The McLennan River is a tributary of the Fraser River in the Robson Valley region of British Columbia. The river was named after an engineer on one of the Canadian Pacific Railway surveys in the 1870s.

Course

The McLennan River originates in the Premier Range, flowing from McLennan Glacier between Mount Stanley Baldwin and Mount Arthur Meighen. The river flows east out of the mountains into the Rocky Mountain Trench near Valemount. Then it turns northwest, flowing through the Rocky Mountain Trench, picking up tributary streams flowing from the Selwyn Range to the east and the Premier Range to the west. It joins the Fraser River at Tête Jaune Cache.

See also
List of British Columbia rivers

References

Rivers of British Columbia
Tributaries of the Fraser River
Robson Valley